Poerio Mascella (1949/1950 – 1 November 2021) was an Italian professional footballer who played as a goalkeeper for Pistoiese.

References

1950s births
2021 deaths
Italian footballers
U.S. Pistoiese 1921 players
Serie A players
Serie B players
Association football goalkeepers